The Edward R. Murrow Award for Excellence in Public Diplomacy is an award given annually to a U.S. State Department employee by the Fletcher School at Tufts University.

The Washington Post reported in 2006 that "the award, named for the legendary journalist who went on to head the U.S. Information Agency, is given to a State Department employee 'who best exemplifies the standards of dedication, integrity, courage, sensitivity and excellence in the field of public diplomacy,' [Secretary of State Condoleezza] Rice said."

External links 
 The Edward R. Murrow Center: Events

References 
 Al Kamen. "Diplomacy Ain't What It Used to Be" The Washington Post, November 29, 2006. Accessed October 12, 2007.

Murrow Award, Edward R.
Diplomatic awards and decorations